Eucalyptus wyolensis, commonly known as the Wyola mallee, is a species of mallee that is endemic to South Australia. It has rough bark on the base of the stems, smooth grey to brown bark above, heart-shaped to egg-shaped adult leaves arranged in opposite pairs, flower buds in groups of seven to eleven, pale yellow flowers and cup-shaped to barrel-shaped fruit.

Description
The bark is rough and fibrous on the base of the trunk, sometimes to the larger branches, and smooth grey to brown or cream-coloured above. Flowering has been observed in July and the flowers are pale yellow.

Taxonomy and naming
Eucalyptus wyolensis was first formally described in 1988 by Clifford David Boomsma in the Journal of the Adelaide Botanic Garden from specimens collected west of Carle Thulka and south of Lake Wyola in 1987. The specific epithet and the common name is a reference to its occurrence near Lake Wyola in the Great Victoria Desert.

Distribution and habitat
This mallee is only known from two populations between Lake Maurice and the border with Western Australia where it grows on red sandplain.

See also
List of Eucalyptus species

References

wyolensis
Myrtales of Australia
Flora of South Australia
Mallees (habit)
Plants described in 1988